Sam Robertson (born 1993) is an Australian alpine ski racer.

He competed at the 2015 World Championships in Beaver Creek, USA, in the Super-G.

References

1993 births
Australian male alpine skiers
Living people